Cameraria barlowi is a moth of the family Gracillariidae. It is found in Pahang, Malaysia, and in Vietnam.

The wingspan is about 3.2 mm.

References

barlowi

Moths of Asia
Leaf miners
Moths described in 1993
Lepidoptera of Malaysia
Taxa named by Tosio Kumata